Hunger is the first album released by Sunderland indie band Frankie & The Heartstrings. It was released on 21 February 2011 on the band's own label, Pop Sex Ltd., a subsidiary of Wichita Recordings. A live version of the album was available to redeem online when bought from HMV. The album, produced by Orange Juice's Edwyn Collins, was recorded at his West Heath Studios, in London.

The chorus from single 'Hunger' was used in a TV advert for Domino's Pizza.

Track listing

Reception

The album received favourable reviews from critics, with Lisa Wright of NME Magazine, stating '‘Hunger’ will, like all great albums, undoubtedly polarise opinions, but take Frankie to your hearts and it’ll swallow you whole'. The Guardian said of the album that it is 'a tonic for winter-dulled spirits.'

References

External links
 Frankie & The Heartstrings Official Site

2011 debut albums
Wichita Recordings albums
Frankie & the Heartstrings albums